Ballot Measure 19 was a citizen's initiative in the U.S. state of Oregon in 1994. The measure sought to amend the Oregon Constitution, limiting free speech protection for obscenity and child pornography. The measure was rejected by the voters 54.3 percent to 45.7 percent.

The measure was sponsored by the Oregon Citizens Alliance, the sponsor of Oregon Ballot Measure 9 (also a constitutional amendment), which among other things sought to prevent all governments in Oregon from using their resources to promote, encourage or facilitate homosexuality.

The text of the measure read as follows:

Opposing the measure were a coalition of groups that made up the "No Censorship - No On 19" Committee, led by the American Civil Liberties Union. Other groups included bookstores, video stores and student groups.

The OCA also sponsored Measure 13 in the same year.

See also 
 Jacobellis v. Ohio, a 1964 U.S. Supreme Court decision
 I know it when I see it
 Miller v. California, a 1973 U.S. Supreme Court decision
 List of Oregon ballot measures

References 

1994 Oregon ballot measures
Initiatives in the United States
Pornography in Oregon